The Verkehrsbetrieb der Stadtwerke Solingen GmbH, or SWS, is a public transport company in the German city of Solingen and its surrounding area. Stadtwerke Solingen operates the Solingen trolleybus system as well as various bus lines and is a member of the Verkehrsverbund Rhein-Ruhr transport agency.

History

Solingen city tramway
The metre gauge Solingen city tramway began operations on December 30, 1896, by the Union-Elektricitäts-Gesellschaft (UEG) from Berlin. The first route began by Stöckerberg near the  tollgate, and down cologne street to the Südbahnhof, service began on June 7, 1897. Another line  followed the same day, beginning at Neumarkt near the Kaiserstraße, next to Schützenstraße and down Burger Straße to Krahenhöhe it was 2.4 kilometers in length.

References

Bus companies of Germany
Trolleybus transport in Germany
Companies based in Solingen